Hasnain Niels Kazim  (born 1974) is a German journalist and writer of Pakistani origin. He is a winner of the CNN Journalist Award in 2009.

Kazim was born in Oldenburg, West Germany, to Pakistani parents whose families had migrated to Karachi from India during the independence of Pakistan in 1947. He became a naturalised German citizen at the age of 16. and joined the German Navy in 1994. He was honourably discharged as an officer in 2000.

From 2009 until 2013 he was the South Asia correspondent of German news magazine ″Der Spiegel″ based in Islamabad. Afterwards he was the magazine's Turkey correspondent based in Istanbul. The Turkish authorities declined to renew his press credentials and connected to that his legal residency, which forced him to leave the country in March 2016. He then relocated to Vienna but carried on reporting about Turkish affairs. In 2019 he left ″Der Spiegel″ and became a freelance author.

He has written a book in which he describes how his family first migrated from India to Karachi in 1947 and then in the seventies, migrated from there to Germany. Kazim recounts his German, Indian and Pakistani origins and discusses Germany's foreign policy.

References

1974 births
Living people
German expatriates in Pakistan
German journalists
German male journalists
German political writers
German people of Pakistani descent
German male writers
German people of Indian descent
Der Spiegel people
German Navy personnel
People from Oldenburg (city)